Orehovo is a settlement in the Municipality of Sevnica in central Slovenia. It lies on the left bank of the Sava River northwest of Sevnica. The area is part of the traditional region of Lower Styria. The municipality is now included in the Lower Sava Statistical Region.

References

External links
Orehovo at Geopedia

Populated places in the Municipality of Sevnica